The 2014–15 St. Louis Blues season was the 48th season for the National Hockey League franchise that was established on June 5, 1967.

Off-season
Coach Ken Hitchcock was extended through this season on May 7, 2014, as were Associate Coach Brad Shaw and Assistant Coach Ray Bennett. Assistant Coach Gary Shaw and Goaltending Coach Corey Hirsch were not retained. Kirk Muller, 48, was named assistant coach by General Manager Doug Armstrong on May 13, 2014. Muller was formerly head coach of the Carolina Hurricanes in parts of the last three seasons.

Goaltender Brian Elliott re-signed for a three-year extension on May 19, 2014, for $7.5 million. He will team with Jake Allen. Ryan Miller will become an unrestricted free agent in July.

The Blues on May 27, replaced their unretained goaltending coach with Jim Corsi, formerly goaltending coach of the last 16 seasons with the Buffalo Sabres.

Playoffs

The St. Louis Blues entered the playoffs as the Central Division regular season champions. The Blues took on the wild card Minnesota Wild  in the first round. The Blues were defeated in six games by the Wild.

Standings

Schedule and results

Pre-season

Regular season

Playoffs

Player statistics
Final Stats

Skaters

Stats reflect time with Blues only. 
Stats reflect time with Blues only. 
Bold = leading team in category.

Goaltenders

Awards and honours

Awards

Milestones

Transactions
Following the end of the Blues' 2013–14 season, and during the 2014–15 season, this team has been involved in the following transactions:

Trades

Free agents acquired

Free agents lost

Lost via waivers

Lost via retirement

Player signings

Draft picks

The 2014 NHL Entry Draft will be held on June 27–28, 2014 at the Wells Fargo Center in Philadelphia, Pennsylvania.

Draft notes
Edmonton's second-round pick will go to St. Louis, as the result of a trade on July 10, 2013 that sent David Perron to Edmonton, in exchange for Magnus Paajarvi, and this pick.
 The Calgary Flames' fourth-round pick went to the St. Louis Blues as the result of a trade on June 28, 2014 that sent Roman Polak to Toronto in exchange for Carl Gunnarsson and this pick.     Toronto previously acquired this pick as the result of a trade on September 29, 2013 that sent Joe Colborne to Calgary in exchange for this pick (being conditional at the time of the trade). The condition – If Calgary fails to qualify for the 2014 Stanley Cup playoffs then this pick will remain a fourth-round pick in 2014 – was converted on March 30, 2014.
Tampa Bay's fourth-round pick will go to St. Louis, as the result of a trade on July 10, 2012 that sent B. J. Crombeen and a fifth-round pick in 2014 to Tampa Bay, in exchange for a fourth-round pick in 2013, and this pick.
St. Louis's fourth-round pick will go to the Nashville Predators, as the result of a trade on June 30, 2013 that sent a fourth-round pick in 2013 to St. Louis, in exchange for a seventh-round pick in 2013, and this pick.
Calgary's fifth-round pick will go to St. Louis, as the result of a trade on July 5, 2013 that sent Kris Russell to Calgary, in exchange for this pick.
St. Louis's fifth-round pick will go to the Tampa Bay Lightning, as the result of a trade on July 10, 2012 that sent fourth-round picks in 2013 and 2014 to St. Louis, in exchange for B. J. Crombeen and this pick.
Boston's sixth-round pick will go to St. Louis, as the result of a trade on April 3, 2013 that sent Wade Redden to Boston, in exchange for this pick (being conditional at the time of the trade). The condition – St. Louis will receive a sixth-round pick in 2014 if Redden appears in one playoff game in the 2013 for the Bruins – was converted on May 1, 2013.

References

St. Louis Blues seasons
St. Louis
St. Louis Blues season, 2014-15
St. Louis Blues
St. Louis Blues